is a Japanese manga artist. He was born in Matsumae District, Fukushima, Hokkaido and graduated from Waseda University's Department of Literature.

Bibliography
(Manga works as Tou Moriyama not listed)
 (1984) Hora Konna ni Akaku Natteru
 (1986) Makasensasei!
 (1986) 
 (1987) Kiwamete Kamoshida
 (1988) Gomen ne B-Boy
 (1989) ; English translation: Dance till Tomorrow (1999)
 (1990) Blue
 (1992) Bokura wa minna ikite iru
 (1992) Young & Fine
 (1992) 
 (1993) Yume de aimashou
 (1993) Kamoshida-kun Fight!
 (1994) Kimi to itsu made mo
 (1994) Koke Dish
 (1994) Summer Memories

 (1994)  is a four volume manga by Yamamoto appearing in Weekly Big Comic Spirits and published by Shogakukan. It was adapted into a live-action film directed by Masaaki Odagiri in 1996.  Arigatō is a story about how a Japanese family's life goes wrong.
 (1997) Fragments
 (1999) 
 (2000) 
 (2002) Anju no Chi
 (2005) Aozora
 (2007) Red, won the Japanese government's Japan Media Arts Festival manga award for 2010

Contributed works
 Angelium (OVA): Color Checking
 Dark (OVA): Finishing Supervision
 Hooligan (OVA) : Finishing
 Sousei no Aquarion (TV) : Digital Paint (ep 6)

Under the name Tō Moriyama
  (OVA)
 "Tō Moriyama Special I: Five Hour Venus"
 "Tō Moriyama Special II: Afterschool XXX"
 "Tō Moriyama Best Hit: It May Be So"
  (OVA)

References

External links
 
 

Living people
Year of birth missing (living people)
Manga artists from Hokkaido
Anime character designers
Waseda University alumni